Here's My Love is the fourth studio album recorded by American singer Linda Clifford, released in 1979 on the RSO/Curtom label.

Chart performance
The album peaked at No. 47 on the R&B albums chart. It also reached No. 117 on the Billboard 200. The album features the single "I Just Wanna Wanna", which peaked at No. 36 on the Hot Soul Singles chart. In addition, all the cuts of the  album peaked at No. 73 on the Hot Dance/Disco chart.

Track listing

Charts

Singles

References

External links
 

1979 albums
Linda Clifford albums
Albums produced by Norman Harris
Albums produced by Curtis Mayfield
Albums recorded at Sigma Sound Studios
RSO Records albums
Curtom Records albums